Club Social Deportivo Octavio Espinosa is a Peruvian football club, playing in the city of Ica, Peru.

The club were founded 1923 and play in the Copa Perú which is the third division of the Peruvian league.

History
In the 1967 Copa Perú, the club classified to the Final Stage, but was eliminated by Alfonso Ugarte de Chiclín.

The club have played at the highest level of Peruvian football on thirteen occasions, from 1966 Torneo Descentralizado until 1971 Torneo Descentralizado, and from 1984 Torneo Descentralizado until 1991 Torneo Descentralizado when was relegated.

Name and spelling
Octavio Espinosa Gonzales was a pioneer aviator and journalist born in Lima in 1882, who was devoted to civil aviation. In 1920, he was the victim of a tragic accident with American airplane pilot Walter Pack in which he hit the hacienda Oquendo. Oral tradition has it that Espinosa landed in Ica on one of his flights; however, the experienced and highly regarded journalist Jose Ica Lujan, who thoroughly reviewed the archives of the newspaper La Voz de Ica, noted that there was no journalistic record of such an event, which by its nature would have been recorded in the city at the time. Whatever occurred, the residents of the street Paita apparently took that reference to christen the team.

Although there are occasional spelling mistakes in the name of the club, sometimes written as "Octavio Espinoza" (with "z"), the origin of the name, described above, removes any doubt about the correct spelling. The club is called "Octavio Espinosa" (with "s"). Because of the existence of both surnames with variant spellings, sometimes it was erroneously written with "z". However, the newspaper La Voz de Ica received in the seventies a letter from Don Octavio Espinosa Sanchez, son of Don Octavio Espinosa Gonzales, requesting a clarification because his surname was spelled with an "s" and surmised the founders' intention had been to name the club after his father and that there had been a corruption of the name of the club in the oral tradition. Therefore La Voz de Ica, the oldest newspaper of Ica, and DeChalaca.com, spell the name of the club as "Octavio Espinosa," even though in some official documents erroneously placed with "z".

Honours

National
Copa Perú: 0
Runner-up (1): 1967

Regional
Liga Departamental de Ica:
Winners (5): 1972, 1973, 1978, 1979, 1981
Runner-up (2): 2016, 2019

Liga Provincial de Ica:
Winners (23): 1939, 1940, 1941, 1942, 1943, 1945, 1947, 1948, 1949, 1950, 1951, 1952, 1953, 1955, 1956, 1961, 1962, 1963, 1964, 1965, 1979, 2012, 2013
Runner-up (1): 2022

Liga Distrital de Ica:
Winners (8): 1961, 1962, 1963, 1964, 1965, 2013, 2014, 2018
Runner-up (3): 2010, 2012, 2019

See also
List of football clubs in Peru
Peruvian football league system

References 

Football clubs in Peru
Association football clubs established in 1923